The Center for Countering Digital Hate (CCDH) is a British non-profit organisation with offices in London and Washington, DC. It campaigns for big tech firms to stop providing services to individuals who may promote hate and misinformation, including neo-Nazis and anti-vaccine advocates. CCDH is a member of the Stop Hate For Profit coalition.

According to public records, the organisation was incorporated in 2018 in London as Brixton Endeavours Limited. It changed its name to Center for Countering Digital Hate in August 2019. In 2021, its US office was registered as a nonprofit organisation in the United States.

Its current CEO is Imran Ahmed.

Activities

The CCDH has targeted social media platforms for what it says are insufficient efforts on their part to fight neo-Nazis and anti-vaccine advocates.

Campaigns

Campaign against Galloway and Hopkins

In January 2020, the CCDH campaigned against Katie Hopkins, a far-right political commentator, and George Galloway, a veteran left-wing politician and broadcaster. TV presenter Rachel Riley and the CCDH directly lobbied "big tech" companies to have these individuals removed from major social media platforms. According to media reports, Riley and Imran Ahmed had a "secret meeting" with Twitter's London based staff in January 2020, demanding the removal of Hopkins and Galloway from their platform.

CCDH's attempt to remove Galloway from Twitter failed, but Hopkins had her account suspended for a week in February 2020, and removed permanently in July 2020.

Campaign against David Icke

In April 2020 the CCDH launched a campaign against the British conspiracy theorist David Icke, who gained increased media attention during the COVID-19-associated lockdown in the United Kingdom. The CCDH released a 25-page pamphlet attacking Icke entitled #DeplatformIcke and campaigned to persuade social media platforms to remove his accounts, portraying him as a "hate actor".

In November 2020, Twitter removed Icke's account for violating the site's rules against spreading misinformation about the COVID-19 pandemic.

Stop Funding Misinformation 

Originally called Stop Funding Fake News, the campaign asks advertisers to stop placing ads on web sites it argues are spreading misinformation ("fake news"). It began as a grassroot campaign in March 2019, inspired by the US success of Sleeping Giants which had convinced several advertisers not to advertise on the Breitbart News website. Ted Baker, Adobe Inc., Chelsea FC, eBay and Manchester United were among the 40 brands and charities that the campaign had persuaded to stop advertising on what it called fake news sites.

In March 2019, charity Macmillan Cancer Support removed an advertisement from The Canary website after complaints from the campaign and from others. The campaign maintained that The Canary promoted conspiracy theories, defended antisemitism, and published fake news. The Canary said changes to Google and Facebook's algorithms and the Stop Funding Fake News campaign led to The Canary downsizing its operations; it said that it was "against the actions of a state, not against Jewish people as an ethnic group" and that it had been "smeared with accusations of anti-Semitism by those who've weaponised the term for political ends". Labour Party MP Chris Williamson described the campaign against The Canary as "sinister".

Other campaigns

The CCDH notified Google that the Zero Hedge website had published what it called "racist articles" about the Black Lives Matter protests. As a result, in June 2020, Google found that reader comments on Zero Hedge breached its policies and banned Zero Hedge from its advertising platform.

Campaign against climate change deniers 

In November 2021, a study by the CCDH identified "ten fringe publishers" that together were responsible for nearly 70 percent of Facebook user interactions with content that denied climate change. Facebook said the percentage was overstated and called the study misleading. The "toxic ten" publishers were Breitbart News, The Western Journal, Newsmax, Townhall, Media Research Center, The Washington Times, The Federalist, The Daily Wire, RT, and The Patriot Post.

TikTok 
In December 2022, the CCDH reported that the social media platform TikTok promoted self-harm and dieting content to users.

Publications
 Don't Feed the Trolls: How to Deal with Hate on Social Media (2019) – a 12-page pamphlet on how internet trolls operate, linked to a campaign of the same name involving Gary Lineker and other celebrities
 The Anti-Vaxx Industry (2020) – criticises social media platforms for the growth of anti-vaccination ('anti-vaxx') activists
 Will to Act (2020) – argues that the largest social media companies fail to enforce their own rules preventing anti-vaccine and COVID-19 conspiracy theory content
 The Anti-Vaxx Playbook (2020) – claims to provide insight into anti-vaxx tactics, messages, and the use of social media
 Hatebook (2020) – co-authored by the Coalition for a Safer Web, accuses Facebook and Instagram of hosting 61 accounts that were selling neo-Nazi merchandise to fund far-right extremism.
 Failure to Act (2021) – jointly with Restless Development, tracks action taken by social media companies in response to anti-vaccine content
 Malgorithm (2021) – a critical analysis of Instagram and Facebook’s user engagement and content recommendation algorithm
 The Disinformation Dozen (2021) – identifies the top 12 spreaders of anti-vaccine disinformation on social media platforms as Joseph Mercola, Robert F. Kennedy, Jr., Ty and Charlene Bollinger, Sherri Tenpenny, Rizza Islam, Rashid Buttar, Erin Elizabeth, Sayer Ji, Kelly Brogan, Christiane Northrup, Ben Tapper and Kevin Jenkins. The report cites these individuals as responsible for 65% of all anti-vaccination content across Facebook, Instagram and Twitter.
 The Toxic Ten (2021) – identifies "ten fringe publishers" that together were responsible for nearly 70 percent of Facebook user interactions with content that denied climate change: Breitbart News, The Western Journal, Newsmax, Townhall, Media Research Center, The Washington Times, The Federalist, The Daily Wire, RT (TV network), and The Patriot Post.

See also
 Internet censorship in the United Kingdom
 Stop Funding Hate, another British campaign with a similar methodology

References

Further reading

External links
 Official website

2010s establishments in the United Kingdom
Companies based in the London Borough of Barnet